Boop-Oop-a-Doop is an animated short film created by Fleischer Studios on January 16, 1932, as part of the Talkartoon series.

Plot
The film begins with a giant Betty Boop flag which flies over the big top. Betty works as a lion tamer and a tightrope walker. Another of the other circus attractions is Koko the Clown. While performing on the highwire the villainous ringmaster lusts for Betty as he watches her from below, singing "Do Something," a song previously performed by Helen Kane. As Betty returns to her tent, the ringmaster follows her inside and sensually massages her legs, surrounds her and threatens her job if she does not submit. Betty begs the ringmaster to cease his advances, as she sings "Don't Take My Boop-Oop-A-Doop Away". Koko the Clown is outside, practicing his juggling, and hears the struggle. He leaps in to save Betty's virtue, struggling with the ringmaster who loads him into a cannon, firing it, and, thinking that he has sent the hero away, laughing with self-satisfaction. But Koko is hiding inside the cannon, and strikes the ringmaster out cold with a mallet, returning with "the last laugh". When Koko expresses concern about Betty's welfare, she answers in song, "No, he couldn't take my boop-oop-a-doop away!" The film ends with Koko sweetly kissing Betty on the cheek.

See also
 Musical Justice (1931)

References

External links
Boop-Oop-a-Doop at IMDB
Boop-Oop-a-Doop at Heptune
Boop-Oop-a-Doop at Bcdb
 

1932 films
Betty Boop cartoons
1930s American animated films
American black-and-white films
Paramount Pictures short films
Fleischer Studios short films
Short films directed by Dave Fleischer
Circus films
1930s English-language films